Franciscan Friary, Winchester was a friary dedicated to St. Francis in Hampshire, England. It was founded by Albert of Pisa in 1237 and dissolved in 1538. There are no remains but the location is thought to  have been somewhere between Lower Brook Street and Middle Brook Street.

References

Friaries in Hampshire
Winchester
History of Winchester
1237 establishments in England
Christian monasteries established in the 13th century
1538 disestablishments in England